Bitter Flowers is 2007 Norwegian crime thriller film directed by Ulrik Imtiaz Rolfsen. It is the first in a series of twelve films about the private detective Varg Veum, based on the books by Gunnar Staalesen. The film stars Trond Espen Seim as Veum.

Plot 
A man vanishes without a trace. His lover, a married, successful politician, discreetly contacts private investigator Varg Veum for assistance. Varg finds her lover murdered, and the politician's husband is arrested for the murder. However, Varg accuses the police of miscarriage of justice and gets involved in an international murder case branching out far beyond Norwegian borders, with adversaries who will stop at nothing.

Cast 
 Trond Espen Seim as Varg Veum
 Kathrine Fagerland as Anna Keilhaug
 Bjørn Floberg as Hamre
 Endre Hellestveit	as Isachsen
 Anders Dale as Odin
 Øyvind Gran as Trygve
 Ove Andreassen as Monrad
 Per Jansen as Harald
 Trine Wiggen as Vibeke
 Håvard Bakke as Bård
 Nicholas Hope as Warren Donaldson

Reception 
The film was reviewed with a "die throw" of 4 in VG, Dagsavisen, Bergens Tidende, Bergensavisen, Adresseavisen. Stavanger Aftenblad, Klassekampen, Fædrelandsvennen and Fredriksstad Blad; 3 in Dagbladet and Hamar Arbeiderblad; and 2 in Aftenposten, Dagens Næringsliv, which gave no "die throw," called the main character "dime-a-dozen" and the plot somewhat cliché.

References

External links 

2007 films
2000s Norwegian-language films
Norwegian detective films